A medieval university was a corporation organized during the Middle Ages for the purposes of higher education. The first Western European institutions generally considered to be universities were established in present-day Italy (including the Kingdom of Sicily, the Kingdom of Naples, and the Kingdom of Italy), the Kingdom of England, the Kingdom of France, Holy Roman Empire, the Kingdom of Spain, the Kingdom of Portugal and the Kingdom of Scotland between the 11th and 15th centuries for the study of the arts and the higher disciplines of theology, law, and medicine. These universities evolved from much older Christian cathedral schools and monastic schools, and it is difficult to define the exact date when they became true universities, though the lists of studia generalia for higher education in Europe held by the Vatican are a useful guide.

Eventually, probably in the late 14th century, the term began to appear by itself to exclusively mean a self-regulating community of teachers and scholars recognized and sanctioned by civil or ecclesiastical authority.

From the Early Modern period onward, this Western-style organizational form gradually spread from the medieval Latin west across the globe, eventually replacing all other higher-learning institutions and becoming the pre-eminent model for higher education everywhere.

Antecedents 

The university is generally regarded as a formal institution that has its origin in the Medieval Christian setting. For hundreds of years prior to the establishment of universities, European higher education took place in Christian cathedral schools and monastic schools (scholae monasticae), where monks and nuns taught classes. Evidence of these immediate forerunners of the university at many places dates back to the 6th century AD.

With the increasing growth and urbanization of European society during the 12th and 13th centuries, a demand grew for professional clergy. Following the Gregorian Reform's emphasis on canon law and the study of the sacraments, bishops formed cathedral schools to train the clergy in canon law, and also in the more secular aspects of religious administration, including logic and disputation for use in preaching and theological discussion, and accounting to  control finances more effectively. Pope Gregory VII was critical in promoting and regulating the concept of modern university, as his 1079 Papal Decree ordered the regulated establishment of cathedral schools  that transformed themselves into the first European universities.

Learning became essential to advancing in the ecclesiastical hierarchy, and teachers also gained prestige. Demand quickly outstripped the capacity of cathedral schools, each of which was essentially run by one teacher. In addition, tensions rose between the students of cathedral schools and burghers in smaller towns. As a result, cathedral schools migrated to large cities, like Bologna, Rome and Paris.

Syed Farid Alatas has noted some parallels between madrasahs and early European colleges and has inferred that the first universities in Europe were influenced by the madrasahs in Islamic Spain and the Emirate of Sicily. George Makdisi, Toby Huff and Norman Daniel, however, have questioned this, citing the lack of evidence for an actual transmission from the Islamic world to Christian Europe and highlighting the differences in the structure, methodologies, procedures, curricula and legal status of the "Islamic college" (madrasa) versus the European university.

Establishment 

Hastings Rashdall set out the modern understanding of the medieval origins of the universities, noting that the earliest universities emerged spontaneously as "a scholastic Guild, whether of Masters or Students... without any express authorization of King, Pope, Prince or Prelate."

Among the earliest universities of this type were the University of Bologna (1088), University of Paris (c. 1150), University of Oxford (1167), University of Modena (1175), University of Palencia (1208), University of Cambridge (1209), University of Salamanca (1218), University of Montpellier (1220), University of Padua (1222), University of Naples (1224), University of Toulouse (1229), University of Orleans (1235), University of Siena (1240), University of Valladolid (1241) University of Northampton (1261), University of Coimbra (1288), University of Pisa (1343), Charles University in Prague (1348), Jagiellonian University (1364), University of Vienna (1365), Heidelberg University (1386) and the University of St Andrews (1413) begun as private corporations of teachers and their pupils.

In many cases universities petitioned secular power for privileges and this became a model. Emperor Frederick I in Authentica Habita (1158) gave the first privileges to students in Bologna. Another step was when Pope Alexander III in 1179 "forbidding masters of the church schools to take fees for granting the license to teach (licentia docendi), and obliging them to give license to properly qualified teachers". Rashdall considered that the integrity of a university was only preserved in such an internally regulated corporation, which protected the scholars from external intervention.  This independently evolving organization was absent in the universities of southern Italy and Spain, which served the bureaucratic needs of monarchs—and were, according to Rashdall, their artificial creations.

The University of Paris was formally recognized when Pope Gregory IX issued the bull Parens scientiarum (1231).  This was a revolutionary step: studium generale (university) and universitas (corporation of students or teachers) existed even before, but after the issuing of the bull, they attained autonomy. "[T]he papal bull of 1233, which stipulated that anyone admitted as a teacher in Toulouse had the right to teach everywhere without further examinations (ius ubique docendi), in time, transformed this privilege into the single most important defining characteristic of the university and made it the symbol of its institutional autonomy .... By the year 1292, even the two oldest universities, Bologna and Paris, felt the need to seek similar bulls from Pope Nicholas IV."

By the 13th century, almost half of the highest offices in the Church were occupied by degree masters (abbots, archbishops, cardinals), and over one-third of the second-highest offices were occupied by masters. In addition, some of the greatest theologians of the High Middle Ages, Thomas Aquinas and Robert Grosseteste, were products of the medieval university.

The development of the medieval university coincided with the widespread reintroduction of Aristotle from Byzantine and Arab scholars.  In fact, the European university put Aristotelian and other natural science texts at the center of its curriculum, with the result that the "medieval university laid far greater emphasis on science than does its modern counterpart and descendent."

Although it has been assumed that the universities went into decline during the Renaissance due to the scholastic and Aristotelian emphasis of its curriculum being less popular than the cultural studies of Renaissance humanism, Toby Huff has noted the continued importance of the European universities, with their focus on Aristotle and other scientific and philosophical texts into the early modern period, arguing that they played a crucial role in the Scientific Revolution of the 16th and 17th centuries. As he puts it "Copernicus, Galileo, Tycho Brahe, Kepler, and Newton were all extraordinary products of the apparently Procrustean and allegedly Scholastic universities of Europe... Sociological and historical accounts of the role of the university as an institutional locus for science and as an incubator of scientific thought and arguments have been vastly understated."

Characteristics 

Initially medieval universities did not have physical facilities such as the campus of a modern university. Classes were taught wherever space was available, such as churches and homes. A university was not a physical space but a collection of individuals banded together as a universitas. Soon, however, universities began to rent, buy or construct buildings specifically for the purposes of teaching.

Universities were generally structured along three types, depending on who paid the teachers. The first type was in Bologna, where students hired and paid for the teachers. The second type was in Paris, where teachers were paid by the church. Oxford and Cambridge were predominantly supported by the crown and the state, which helped them survive the Dissolution of the Monasteries in 1538 and the subsequent removal of all principal Catholic institutions in England. These structural differences created other characteristics. At the Bologna university the students ran everything—a fact that often put teachers under great pressure and disadvantage. In Paris, teachers ran the school; thus Paris became the premiere spot for teachers from all over Europe. Also, in Paris the main subject matter was theology, so control of the qualifications awarded was in the hands of an external authority – the chancellor of the diocese. In Bologna, where students chose more secular studies, the main subject was law.

It was also characteristic of teachers and scholars to move around. Universities often competed to secure the best and most popular teachers, leading to the marketisation of teaching. Universities published their list of scholars to entice students to study at their institution. Students of Peter Abelard followed him to Melun, Corbeil, and Paris, showing that popular teachers brought students with them.

Students 
Students attended the medieval university at different ages—from 14 if they were attending Oxford or Paris to study the arts, to their 30s if they were studying law in Bologna. During this period of study, students often lived far from home and unsupervised, and as such developed a reputation, both among contemporary commentators and modern historians, for drunken debauchery. Students are frequently criticized in the Middle Ages for neglecting their studies for drinking, gambling and sleeping with prostitutes. In Bologna, some of their laws permitted students to be citizens of the city if they were enrolled at a university.

Course of study 

University studies took six years for a Master of Arts degree (a Bachelor of Arts degree was awarded after completing the third or fourth year).  Studies for this were organized by the faculty of arts, where the seven liberal arts were taught: arithmetic, geometry, astronomy, music theory, grammar, logic, and rhetoric. All instruction was given in Latin and students were expected to converse in that language. The trivium comprised the three subjects that were taught first: grammar, logic, and rhetoric. The quadrivium consisted of arithmetic, geometry, music, and astronomy. The quadrivium was taught after the preparatory work of the trivium and would lead to the degree of Master of Arts. The curriculum came also to include the three Aristotelian philosophies: physics, metaphysics and moral philosophy.

Much of medieval thought in philosophy and theology can be found in scholastic textual commentary because scholasticism was such a popular method of teaching. Aelius Donatus' Ars grammatica was the standard textbook for grammar; also studied were the works of Priscian and Graecismus by Eberhard of Béthune. Cicero's works were used for the study of rhetoric. Studied books on logic included Porphyry's introduction to Aristotelian logic, Gilbert de la Porrée's De sex principiis and Summulae Logicales by Petrus Hispanus (later Pope John XXI). The standard work of astronomy was Tractatus de sphaera.

Once a Master of Arts degree had been conferred, the student could leave the university or pursue further studies in one of the higher faculties, law, medicine, or theology, the last one being the most prestigious. Originally, only few universities had a faculty of theology, because the popes wanted to control the theological studies. Until the mid-14th century, theology could be studied only at universities in Paris, Oxford, Cambridge and Rome. First the establishment of the University of Prague (1347) ended their monopoly and afterwards also other universities got the right to establish theological faculties.

A popular textbook for theological study was called the Sentences (Quattuor libri sententiarum) of Peter Lombard; theology students as well as masters were required to lecture or to write extensive commentaries on this text as part of their curriculum.  Studies in the higher faculties could take up to twelve years for a master's degree or doctorate (initially the two were synonymous), though again a bachelor's and a licentiate's degree could be awarded along the way.

Courses were offered according to books, not by subject or theme. For example, a course might be on a book by Aristotle, or a book from the Bible. Courses were not elective: the course offerings were set, and everyone had to take the same courses. There were, however, occasional choices as to which teacher to use.

Students often entered the university at fourteen to fifteen years of age, though many were older. Classes usually started at 5:00 or 6:00 a.m.

Legal status 

As students had the legal status of clerics, Canon Law prohibited women from being admitted into universities. Students were afforded the legal protection of the clergy, as well. In this way, no one was allowed to physically harm them; they could only be tried for crimes in an ecclesiastical court, and were thus immune from any corporal punishment. This gave students free rein in urban environments to break secular laws with impunity, which led to many abuses: theft, rape, and murder. Students did not face serious consequences from the law. Students were also known to engage in drunkenness. Sometimes citizens were forbidden to interact with students because they made accusations against the university.

This led to uneasy tensions with secular authorities—the demarcation between town and gown. Masters and students would sometimes "strike" by leaving a city and not returning for years. This happened at the University of Paris strike of 1229 after a riot left a number of students dead. The university went on strike and they did not return for two years.

Members of these institutions were encouraged to disseminate their knowledge across Europe, often lecturing at a different .

See also 
 Ancient higher-learning institutions
 Ancient universities of Scotland
 List of oldest universities in continuous operation
 Nation (university)
 Renaissance of the 12th century

References

Bibliography 
 Cobban, Alan B. English University Life in the Middle Ages Columbus: Ohio State University Press, 1999. 
 De Ridder-Symoens, Hilde (ed.): A History of the University in Europe. Vol. I: Universities in the Middle Ages, Cambridge University Press, 1992, 
 Ferruolo, Stephen: The Origins of the University: The Schools of Paris and their Critics, 1100-1215 Stanford: Stanford University Press, 1998. 
 Haskins, Charles Homer: The Rise of Universities. Ithaca, New York: Cornell University Press, 1972. 
 Lee, John S., and Steer, Christian (eds.), Commemoration in Medieval Cambridge History of the University of Cambridge, Boydell, 2018. 
 Pedersen, Olaf, The First Universities: Studium Generale and the Origins of University Education in Europe, Cambridge University Press, 1997.
 Rait, Robert S.: Life in the Medieval University, Cambridge University Press, [1912] 1931, 
 Rashdall, Hastings; revd. by Powicke, F. M., and Emden, A. B.: The Universities of Europe in the Middle Ages, 3 vols. Oxford: Clarendon Press, [1895] 1987,  
 Seybolt, Robert Francis (trans.): The Manuale Scholarium: An Original Account of Life in the Mediaeval University, Cambridge: Harvard University Press, 1921
 Thorndike, Lynn (trans. and ed.): University Records and Life in the Middle Ages, New York: Columbia University Press, 1975,

External links 
 The Shift of Medical Education into the Universities
 The Educational Legacy of Mediaeval and Renaissance Traditions.
 From Manuscript to Print: Evolution of the Mediaeval Book.
 Life of the Students at Paris.
 Mediaeval History: A Mediaeval Atlas
 Cambridge, A Brief History: The Mediaeval University.
 Mediaeval Science, the Church, and Universities
 Quality Assurance In A Globalized Higher Education Environment: An Historical Perspective (DOC file)
 The Rise of Universities (classic), Charles Homer Haskins, 1923

History of academia
Medieval European education
Medieval organizations
Types of university or college